Amal Omran (born June 3, 1968), Syrian actress and director of Syria play. She graduated from the Higher Institute of Theatrical Arts, holds a scholarship to America and the cycle of theatrical rehabilitation in Czechoslovakia. Is one of Aahlat Syrian theater who stands in front of her name Dramatists Arab admiration and appreciation for her career and effort, belong in America to institute a dance expressive, and ran several workshops for representatives of enthusiasts, it has been found in "Teatro Institute" for the Performing Arts chance of discovering young talents away from memorization and ready-made recipes Representative in management. Basic project embodied in the play elevate taste and refined aesthetic skills of the representative, is a member of the Artists Union. The first experience on stage was in the show (rape) of Jawad al-Asadi.

Works

Dubbing
Bakusō Kyōdai Let's & Go!! – Ryo Takaba
Cyborg Kuro-chan – Kuro (first voice)
Detective Conan – Genta Kojima (first voice), Eri Kisaki (first voice) 
Digimon Adventure 02 – Ken Ichijouji
Idol Densetsu Eriko – Yasuko Nakata
Justice League – Hawkgirl
Mobile Suit Gundam Wing – Relena Peacecraft/Darlian
The Powerpuff Girls – Samara (Buttercup) (Venus Centre version)
Shin Hakkenden – Rei Yozora
Virtua Fighter – Sarah Bryant
Xiaolin Showdown – Omi (season 1 only)
What's New, Scooby-Doo? – Daphne Blake (Venus Centre version)

References

Syrian television actresses
Syrian voice actresses
Living people
1968 births
Syrian stage actresses
Place of birth missing (living people)